Styria, also Slovenian Styria (Slovenska Štajerska) or Lower Styria (Spodnja Štajerska), is a traditional region in northeastern Slovenia, comprising the southern third of the former Duchy of Styria. The population of Styria in its historical boundaries amounts to around 705,000 inhabitants, or 34.5% of the population of Slovenia. The largest city is Maribor.

Use of the term

In the 19th century the Styrian duchy, which existed as a distinct political-administrative entity from 1180 to 1918, used to be divided into three traditional regions: Upper Styria (Obersteiermark; Zgornja Štajerska), Central Styria (Mittelsteiermark; Srednja Štajerska), and Lower Styria, stretching from the Mur River and the Slovene Hills in the north down to the Sava. Upper Styria and Central Styria, predominantly German-speaking, today form the Austrian state of Styria (Steiermark). The southern third, predominantly Slovene-speaking Lower Styria, became part of the Kingdom of Serbs, Croats and Slovenes (Yugoslavia) after World War I. After World War II, it became part of the predecessor of modern Slovenia, the Socialist Republic of Slovenia.

Although used interchangeably at times, the term "Southern Styria" (Südsteiermark) refers to the southern districts of the Austrian state of Styria, whereas the term "Lower Styria" (Spodnja Štajerska) refers to the region of Styria in northeastern Slovenia.

The Slovene name Štajerska is borrowed and adapted from the German name for the region, Steiermark.

History
In the Middle Ages, the Lower Styrian lands were ruled by several immediate (reichsfrei) dynasties like the Counts of Celje, whose large possessions were not incorporated by the Habsburg dukes until the 15th century. 

According to the last Austro-Hungarian census of 1910, Lower Styria had around 498,000 inhabitants, of which around 82% were Slovene and around 18% German speakers.

In 1918, after the disintegration of the Austro-Hungarian monarchy following World War I, the Duchy of Styria was divided between the newly established states of German Austria and the Yugoslav State of Slovenes, Croats and Serbs. In early November 1918, Rudolf Maister, a Slovene major of the former Austro-Hungarian Army, with about 4,000 local volunteers occupied Lower Styria and the town of Maribor and claimed it for Yugoslavia. After a short fight with German-Austrian paramilitary units, the current border was established, acknowledged by the provisional Styrian assembly at Graz. By December 1918, all of Lower Styria was de facto included in the Kingdom of Serbs, Croats, and Slovenes. A protest by German-speaking Marburg citizens resulted in the Marburg Bloody Sunday, when 13 people were killed and about 60 wounded.

Confirmed by the 1919 Treaty of Saint-Germain-en-Laye, the border between Yugoslav and Austrian Styria mostly followed the ethnic-linguistic dividing line between Slovenes and ethnic Germans. Nevertheless, several Slovene-speaking villages around Leutschach, Spielfeld, Soboth, and Bad Radkersburg remained in Austria. On the other hand, several predominantly German-speaking towns remained in Yugoslavia, especially Maribor (80% German speakers), Ptuj (86%), and Celje (67%); in addition, the German-speaking area around the village of Apače was annexed to Yugoslavia. According to the 1921 Yugoslav census, some 22,500 ethnic Germans lived in Yugoslav Styria. They represented around 4.5% of the overall population of the region, and around 57% of all ethnic Germans in Slovenia. In 1931, this number dropped to around 12,500 or 2.3% of the regional population, and around 45% of all ethnic Germans in Slovenia.

In 1922, the County of Maribor was formed, comprising most of the territory of Slovene Styria, plus the Prekmurje and the Međimurje regions. After the coup d'etat of King Alexander I of Yugoslavia in January 1929, the counties were abolished and replaced with nine Banates (Slovene: Banovina). Following the reorganization implemented by the Yugoslav constitution of 1931, Slovene Styria was incorporated in the newly established Drava Banovina, which was more or less identical with Slovenia, with Ljubljana as its capital city.

In April 1941, Nazi Germany invaded Yugoslavia and Slovene Styria was annexed to the Third Reich. A policy of violent Germanization was introduced. Public use of Slovene was prohibited, and all Slovene associations were dissolved. Members of all professional and intellectual groups, including many clergymen, were expelled. Between April 1941 and May 1942, around 80,000 Slovenes (almost 15% of the overall population) were expelled from Lower Styria, or resettled to other parts of the Reich. As a reaction, a resistance movement developed. Many areas of Lower Styria witnessed fierce fighting between German troops and Slovene partisan units.

After World War II, Yugoslav authority over the region was established and Slovene Styria became an integral part of the Socialist Republic of Slovenia. According to prior decisions made by the Anti-Fascist Council of the People's Liberation of Yugoslavia, an expulsion of the remaining ethnic German population was carried out, regardless of their links to the Nazi regime.

Between the 1950s and 1970s, many areas of the region underwent rapid industrialization. Towns like Maribor, Celje, and Velenje became among the most important industrial centers of Slovenia and Yugoslavia.

Statistical division

Lower Styria has no official status as an administrative or statistical unit within Slovenia, although it is widely considered a traditional region. The bulk of Lower Styria is subdivided between the Drava Statistical Region with its seat in Maribor, and the Savinja Statistical Region with its seat in Celje. Smaller areas of Lower Styria are included in:
The Mura Statistical Region: the subregion called Prlekija, with the municipalities of Apače, Gornja Radgona, Križevci, Ljutomer, Radenci, Razkrižje, Sveti Jurij ob Ščavnici, and Veržej;
The Carinthia Statistical Region: the municipalities of Mislinja, Muta, Podvelka, Radlje ob Dravi, Ribnica na Pohorju, Slovenj Gradec, and Vuzenica;
The Lower Sava Statistical Region: the Municipality of Bistrica ob Sotli, and the territory on the left bank of the Sava River in the municipalities of Brežice, Krško, Sevnica, and Radeče;
The Central Sava Statistical Region: the territory on the left bank of the Sava River in the municipalities of Hrastnik and Trbovlje.

Nowadays, many of these peripheral areas are no longer considered part of Styria. An exception is the Prlekija subregion, which is still widely considered part of Styria.

Division into various statistical regions
In 2005, Slovenia was divided into 12 statistical regions. Most of the Styria area is now divided into the Drava region (Podravska regija) and Savinja region (Savinjska regija). An area along the Mura region with Ljutomer as its center, known historically as Prlekija, has been incorporated in the Mura region (Pomurje or Pomurska regija), and a number of Lower Styrian municipalities including the town of Slovenj Gradec have been attached to Carinthia, thereby doubling its area. The name Štajerska disappeared from official use in 1922, when the Kingdom of Serbs, Croats, and Slovenes was administratively divided into oblasts. Nevertheless, the name is still very much alive in both colloquial and media language, and it is part of established cultural and geographical terminology. It also continues to be employed in the promotion of tourism.

Cities and towns
The cultural and economic centre of Lower Styria has always been the city of Maribor. Other major towns are Celje, Velenje, Ptuj, Brežice, and Slovenj Gradec. The latter two are no longer considered to be a part of Styria proper: Slovenj Gradec has been attached to Carinthia, forming that enlarged region's new cultural and economic centre, whereas Brežice is one of the major centers of the Posavje region which developed after World War II on both banks of the Sava river.

Tourism
Styria is known for its white wine, especially Ljutomer Riesling, for the Pohorje ski resort, for cultural festivals and for pumpkin seed oil. It is also known as a hop-growing area producing Styrian Goldings, a variety of the English aroma hop Fuggles.

Prominent people
 Anton Aškerc, poet
 Jože Brilej, politician, diplomat and ambassador of Yugoslavia, politician, President of the United Nations Security Council, chief justice of the supreme court of Slovenia, World War II partisan war hero, editor of Ljudska pravica
 Marta Brilej, diplomat, partisan war hero, head of PR for tourism Yugoslavia, patron of the arts
 Aleš Čeh, football (soccer) player
 Jolanda Čeplak, athlete
 Peter Dajnko, philologist and poet
 Karel Destovnik Kajuh, poet
 Mladen Dolar, philosopher
 Vekoslav Grmič, theologian
 Drago Jančar, writer
 Edvard Kocbek, writer, poet, and politician
 Anton Korošec, politician, Prime Minister of the Kingdom of Yugoslavia
 Janez Menart, poet
 Franz Miklosich, linguist
 Matija Murko, linguist and ethnographer
 Johann Puch, inventor, bicycle industry
 Žarko Petan, film and theatre director
 Zoran Predin, singer-songwriter
 Jože Pučnik, dissident, politician and sociologist
 Benka Pulko, author and Guinness World Record setting motorcycle traveler
 Miha Remec, author
 Anton Martin Slomšek, Roman Catholic bishop
 Jože Snoj, poet
 Wilhelm von Tegetthoff, Austrian admiral
 Danilo Türk, President of Slovenia
 Beno Udrih, basketball player
 Josip Vošnjak, political activist
 Stanko Vraz, poet
 Windisch-Graetz, princely family
 Hugo Wolf, composer
 Zlatko Zahovič, football player
 Milan Zver, politician and political scientist

See also
 History of Slovenia
 History of Styria
 Roman Catholic Diocese of Lavant
 Roman Catholic Archdiocese of Maribor
 Roman Catholic Diocese of Celje
 University of Maribor
 I. High School in Celje
 Savinja
 Rinka Falls
 Counts of Celje

References

External links

 
Historical regions in Slovenia
History of Styria